Manulea hyalinofuscatum is a moth of the family Erebidae. It is found on Wrangel Island and in Chukotka.

References

Moths described in 1990
Lithosiina